Activated is the debut studio album by American rapper Tee Grizzley. It was released on May 11, 2018, by 300 Entertainment. The album features guest appearances from Lil Yachty, Lil Pump, Chris Brown, Moneybagg Yo, Lil Durk, and YFN Lucci, among others. The production on the album was handled by Helluva, London on da Track, The Breed, Chopsquad DJ, The Olympicks, and Infamous Rell. The album was supported by two singles: "Colors" and "Don't Even Trip".

Background
In a statement by Tee Grizzley, he explained the significance of the album title, by stating:

In another statement by Grizzley, he explained the potential impact of the album, by stating:

On April 17, 2018, Tee Grizzley was featured on Zane Lowe's Beats 1 Radio show, in which he revealed some of the guests slated to appear on the album, along with the  album's release date.

Singles
The album's lead single, "Colors", was released for digital download on February 2, 2018, along with the Nick Margetic and Everett Stewart-directed music video. The song was produced by Helluva.

The album's second single, "Don't Even Trip" featuring Moneybagg Yo, was released on March 14, 2018. The song was produced by Chopsquad DJ. The Everett Stewart-directed music video was released on April 18, 2018.

Promotional singles
The album's lead promotional single, "2 Vaults" featuring Lil Yachty was released on March 15, 2018. The song was produced by London on da Track.

The album's second promotional single, "Fuck It Off" featuring Chris Brown was released on May 4, 2018. The song was produced by Helluva.

Commercial performance 
Activated debuted at number 10 on the US Billboard 200 chart, earning 27,000 album-equivalent units (including 4,000 copies of pure album sales) in its first week. This became Tee Grizzley's first US top 10 album.

Track listing

Charts

References

External links
 "Colors" Music Video on YouTube
 "Don't Even Trip" Music Video on YouTube

2018 debut albums
Albums produced by London on da Track
Tee Grizzley albums